Emmanuel Ramazani Shadary (born 29 November 1960) is a politician in the Democratic Republic of the Congo, who was a presidential candidate in the December 2018 presidential elections in the country. He was selected following consultations within the ruling People's Party for Reconstruction and Democracy (PPRD) political party and the Common Front for Congo (FCC), political coalition. Shadary is the permanent secretary of the PPRD, and has previously served as the country's Interior Minister.

He has also served as the governor of the Maniema Province and is a member of the current Parliament of the Democratic Republic of the Congo.

See also
Joseph Kabila
Laurent Kabila

References

External links
Congo's Kabila to step down ahead of presidential election As of 8 August 2018.

Living people
1960 births
People from Maniema
Candidates for President of the Democratic Republic of the Congo
People's Party for Reconstruction and Democracy politicians
University of Kinshasa alumni
University of Lubumbashi alumni
21st-century Democratic Republic of the Congo people